USS LST-544 was a United States Navy  in commission from 1944 to 1946.

Construction and commissioning
LST-544 was laid down on 8 December 1943 at Evansville, Indiana, by the Missouri Valley Bridge and Iron Company. She was launched on 4 February 1944, sponsored by Mrs. Maudie M. Marlow, and commissioned on 16 March 1944.

Service history
LST-544 was not involved in combat operations during World War II.

Decommissioning and disposal
LST-544 was decommissioned on 9 August 1946 and stricken from the Navy List on 25 September 1946. On 23 June 1947, she was sold to Willamette Iron & Steel Company for scrapping.

References

NavSource Online: Amphibious Photo Archive LST-544

 

LST-542-class tank landing ships
World War II amphibious warfare vessels of the United States
Ships built in Evansville, Indiana
1944 ships